The 2007–08 season was U.S. Lecce's second consecutive season in second division of the Italian football league, the Serie B, and the 81st as a football club.

Competitions

Overall record

Serie A

League table

Results summary

Results by round

Matches

Coppa Italia

Statistics

Appearances and goals

References

U.S. Lecce seasons
Lecce